The University of Catania is a university located in Catania, Sicily. Founded in 1434, it is the oldest university in Sicily, the 13th oldest in Italy, and the 29th oldest university in the world. With a population of over 60,000 students, it is the main university in Sicily.

Departments
Following the Italian higher education reform introduced by the law 240/10 and adopted by the University of Catania in its new statute, faculties have been deactivated and departments have been reorganized. The University of Catania now has 17 departments, the Faculty of Medicine, and two special didactic units established in the decentralized offices of Ragusa (Modern Languages) and Syracuse (Architecture). that, additionally to the traditional assignments of scientific research, are in charge of the organization and management of educational activities. A special didactic unit is also the school of excellence "Scuola Superiore di Catania", a higher education centre of the University of Catania conceived in 1998 to select the best young minds and offer them a course of studies including analysis, research and experimentation.

History
The university was founded by King Alfonso I of Sicily on 19 October 1434. A charter was granted after two royal councillors (Adamo Asmundo and Battista Platamone) convinced the king to accept the founding of a Studium Generale in Catania, with the papal recognition arriving ten years later from Pope Eugene IV (18 April 1444). Alfonso V with this gesture wanted to compensate the city (in which there had been recently established the royal court) for moving the Sicilian capital from Catania to Palermo. The activity of the Atheneum actually started a year later, in 1445, with six professors and ten students. The first four faculties were Medicine, Philosophy, Canon and Civil Law and Theology. Lessons were initially held in a building in Piazza del Duomo, next to the Cathedral of Sant'Agata, and eventually moved to the Palazzo dell'Università in the late 1690s. This building remains the office of the rector of the university to this day. The first degree was awarded to Antonio Mantello, from Syracuse, in 1449. During the course of the 16th century, approximately 20-25 degrees were awarded each year. The university (which from the 16th century was referred to as Siculorum Gymnasium) was named Studium Generale because it was the only entity that could release degrees equal to those released in the old Studia of Salamanca, Valladolid, Bologna and this contributed to spread envy in the other Sicilian cities that in culture and traditions didn't feel inferior to Catania. In 1934, the university celebrated its 500th anniversary with King Vittorio Emanuele III of Italy, and, in 1984 the 550th one.

In the early centuries of its existence, the university was administered by the Senate of Catania, overseen by the Viceroy of Sicily, with the bishop of Catania being ex officio Great Chanchellor. With a reform operated by the Viceroy in 1679 the authority of the Bishop prevailed: he had the control over the lecturers, the freshmen and students' curriculum. This led to various conflicts between the civil and religious authorities. From 1818 to the office of Great Chancellor was assigned to the president of the Great Civil Court, instead of the bishop.

List of scholars

Humanities 
 Giuseppe De Felice Giuffrida, Italian politician and journalist, was elected the first Socialist mayor of Catania in 1902.
 Mario Rapisardi, Italian poet and translator, taught at the university in the 1870s. "Love truth more than glory, more than peace, more than life. Make it your sword and your shield."
 Luigi Capuana, writer, journalist, literary critic and theorist. He taught literature in the early years of the 20th century.
 Giovanni Verga, Italian realist writer, author of the Cavalleria Rusticana and I Malavoglia.
 Santo Mazzarino, leading 20th-century historian of ancient Rome and Greece.
 Vitaliano Brancati, Italian novelist and screenwriter, winner of the 1950 Bagutta Prize.
 Elémire Zolla, Italian essayist, philosopher and historian of religion, taught linguistics in the late 1960s.

Sciences 
 Mario Pieri, mathematician, taught descriptive, projective and higher geometry from 1900 to 1908 and supervised 6 doctoral students with dissertations in algebraic geometry. See The Legacy of Mario Pieri in Geometry and Arithmetic, Birkhäuser (E.A. Marchisotto & J.T. Smith (2007).
 Giuseppe Mercalli, inventor of the Mercalli Scale of earthquake intensity, was professor of geology in the late 1880s.
 Annibale Ricco, named Chair of Astrophysics in 1890, was the first director of the Catania Observatory. He was also Chancellor of the university from 1898 to 1900. The crater Ricco on the Moon as well as the asteroid 18462 Ricco are named for him.
 Guido Fubini, author of Fubini's theorem, was a professor of mathematics in the early years of the 20th century. The asteroid, 22495 Fubini, is named in his honor.
 Remo Ruffini, former assistant professor at Princeton University (1971–74), was professor of theoretical physics from 1976 to 1978. He was named Space Scientist of the Year in 1992.
 Paolo Maffei, director of the Catania Observatory from 1975 to 1980, was one of the pioneers of infrared astronomy. He discovered 2 galaxies, Maffei 1 and Maffei 2 in 1967. A main belt asteroid, 18426 Maffei, is also named for him.
 Giuseppe Colombo, physicist and astronomer, NASA consultant and early proponent of tethered satellites. Asteroid 10387 Bepicolombo is named in his honor, as is the Colombo Gap, a 150 km gap in the C ring of the planet Saturn.
 Napoleone Ferrara, molecular biologist, winner of the 2010 Lasker-DeBakey Clinical Medical Research Award, is a 1981 graduate of the Faculty of Medicine.

Points of interest 
 Orto Botanico dell'Università di Catania, the university's botanical garden, founded in 1858.
 Catania Astrophysical Observatory, the university's observatory, founded in 1890.

See also 
 Scuola superiore di Catania (school of excellence of the University of Catania)
 List of the oldest universities
 List of Italian universities
 List of medieval universities

References

External links

 Official website
 University of Catania students' website

University of Catania
University of Catania
1434 establishments in Europe
15th-century establishments in the Kingdom of Sicily
Educational institutions established in the 15th century
Buildings and structures in the Province of Catania
Education in Catania